Michalis Delavinias (1921 – 6 November 2003) was a Greek footballer who played as a goalkeeper for AEK Athens. He was known by the nickname "Black cat", due to the fact that he usually played in a black kit.

Club career

Delavinias started playing football in 1933, playing for the independent club of Athens, the Enosi Agios Eleftherios. In 1934 he joined the infrastructure departments of AEK Athens' academy and in 1938 with coach Kostas Negrepontis he was promoted to the first team, replacing Christos Ribas in a 3–1 against Apollon Athens. He remained at AEK Athens until the period 1954, when he stopped playing football at the age of 33. With AEK he won 2 Panhellenic Championships, 3 Cups and 4 Athens FCA Leagues including a double in 1939, He also played with the Athens Mixed Team.

International career
Delavinias played in four matches for Greece from 1948 to 1951.

He was also part of Greece's squad for the 1952 Summer Olympics, but he did not play in any matches.

Personal life
Delavinias was married and had a child named Elenitsa.

Honours

AEK Athens
Panhellenic Championship: 1938–39, 1939–40
Greek Cup: 1938–39, 1948–49, 1949–50
Athens FCA League: 1940, 1946, 1947, 1950

See also
List of one-club men in association football

References

External links

1921 births
2003 deaths
Greece international footballers
Association football goalkeepers
Footballers from Athens
Greek footballers
AEK Athens F.C. players